Kåre Conradi (born 11 January 1972) is a Norwegian actor.

Conradi was born in Asker and he is a graduate of the Norwegian Theatre Academy and the London Academy of Music and Dramatic Art. He made his stage debut at Oslo Nye Teater in 1989, was employed at the Nationaltheatret from 1995, and also had a stint at Trøndelag Teater. In 2016, he won a Hedda Award for best male actor.

On television, Conradi has appeared in Clique, W1A, Heimebane (Home Ground) and Shetland among other roles. He has been starring in Norwegian historical comedy Norsemen since 2016.

Filmography 
 2022 Plebs: Soldiers of Rome
 2020 Aldri voksen (TV-serie), Sondre
2017 Coco (film), Ernesto de la Cruz
 Vikingane (Norsemen, TV Series), høvding Orm (as Orm)
 Solan og Ludvig - Herfra til Flåklypa (film), Frimand Pløsen
 Solan og Ludvig – Jul i Flåklypa (film), Frimand Pløsen
 Erobreren (TV-serie), Jonas Wergeland 
 Kong Curling (film), Stefan Ravndal 
 2011 Kung Fu Panda 2 (film), Shen
 Svik (film), Svein Nordanger
 Kodenavn Hunter (TV-serie), Øystein Sæther
 Den siste revejakta (film), Glenn
 Wide Blue Yonder (etterproduksjon), Ben
 Gutta Boys (TV-miniserie), Bjørn Tores far
 37 og et halvt (film), Sigurd
 SMS - sju magiske sirkler (TV-serie), Morten
 Spirit – Hingsten fra Cimarron (film), som Spirit og Forteller
 Katteprinsen (film), som prins Luna
 Tiden før Tim (TV-serie – ukjent antall episoder)
 Fjortis (TV-serie), klasseforestander
 Sofies verden (film og TV), Hamlet
 1732 Høtten (film), Finken Hartmann
 Salige er de som tørster (film), Henriksen
 Blind gudinne (TV), Erik Henriksen
 Dag 1 

 Hotell Oslo, (TV-miniserie) Kjetil

References

External links

1972 births
Living people
Norwegian male stage actors
Norwegian male film actors
Norwegian male television actors
People from Asker
Oslo National Academy of the Arts alumni
Norwegian expatriates in England